The Mirror of the World (German: Der Weltspiegel) is a 1918 German silent film directed by Lupu Pick and starring Adolf Klein, Fritz Richard and Gertrude Welcker. It was the directoral debut of Pick who had been a prominent actor of the 1910s but had set up his own production company Rex-Film to take advantage of the booming German film industry. It was shot in Berlin. The film's art direction was by Hans Neirath.

Cast
 Adolf Klein   
 Fritz Richard   
 Gertrude Welcker
 Bernd Aldor
 Bertold Reissig

References

Bibliography
 Kreimeier, Klaus. The Ufa Story: A History of Germany's Greatest Film Company, 1918-1945. University of California Press, 1999.

External links

1918 films
1910s science fiction films
German science fiction films
Films of the German Empire
German silent feature films
Films directed by Lupu Pick
German black-and-white films
1910s German films
1910s German-language films
Silent science fiction films